Giovanni La Camera (born 29 December 1983) is an Italian footballer who plays for Seregno.

Club career
In January 2014 he was signed by Padova. In summer 2014 he left for Juve Stabia. On 4 June 2015 he was released.

In summer 2015 he was signed by Pavia. On 1 February 2016 he left for Serie B club Como.

On 22 August 2016 he was signed by Lupa Roma.

On 3 September 2018 he joined Seregno in Serie D.

References

External links
 AIC profile (data by football.it) 
 

1983 births
Sportspeople from Messina
Living people
Italian footballers
Lupa Roma F.C. players
S.S. Virtus Lanciano 1924 players
Rimini F.C. 1912 players
Benevento Calcio players
F.C. Pavia players
A.S. Cittadella players
Calcio Padova players
S.S. Juve Stabia players
Como 1907 players
FK Partizani Tirana players
Reggina 1914 players
U.S. 1913 Seregno Calcio players
Serie B players
Serie C players
Serie D players
Kategoria Superiore players
Italian expatriate footballers
Expatriate footballers in Albania
Association football midfielders
Footballers from Sicily